Luise Kummer (born 29 June 1993 in Jena) is a German biathlete. She competed in the 2014/15 World Cup season, and represented Germany at the Biathlon World Championships 2015 in Kontiolahti.

References

External links

 

1993 births
Living people
Sportspeople from Jena
German female biathletes